La cerveza is a moth in the family Crambidae. It was described by Bernard Landry in 1995. It is found in North America, where it has been recorded from Arizona, California, Colorado and Texas.
Its binomial means  the beer in Spanish because la  means "the" and cerveza translates as "beer". The genus contains several other puns.

References

Crambini
Moths described in 1995
Moths of North America